The All India Federation of Tax Practitioners (AIFTP) is an association of Advocates, Chartered Accountants and Tax Practitioners in India. The Federation was established in 1976. It includes 138 tax associations and 8900 individual members including leading senior advocates and Chartered Accountants. It is an association formed by those who perform as taxation law practitioners of India. The body was an initiative of Nanabhoy Palkhivala
Its head office is in Mumbai.

Memberships

AIFTP is a member of Asia Oceania Tax Consultants' Association (AOTCA).

Directors
 National President: M. Srinivasa Rao; Tax Practitioner, Eluru, Andhra Pradesh
 Imm. Past President: Nikita Badheka, Advocate, Mumbai
 Dy. President: D. K. Gandhi, Advocate, Ghaziabad, Uttar Pradesh
 Vice Presidents:
O. P. Shukla, Advocate, Varanasi
Anand Pasari, Advocate, Ranchi
S. B. Kabra, Chartered Accountant, Secunderabad
Rajesh Mehta, Chartered Accountant, Indore
Janak Vaghani, Chartered Accountant, Mumbai
Secretary General S. S. Satyanarayana; Tax Practitioner, Hyderabad, Andhra Pradesh
National Treasurer Vijay Narayan Kewalramani, Chartered Accountant, Thane, India

References

External links

Non-profit organisations based in India
Organizations established in 1976
Tax practitioner associations
1976 establishments in India